Marjorie's wrasse, Cirrhilabrus marjorie, is a species of wrasse native to the coral reefs of the Fiji. The specific name honours Marjorie Awai, the Curator of the Florida Aquarium, and who was formerly a Curatorial Assistant in the ichthyology Department at the Bishop Museum in Hawaii.

References

External links
 

Marjorie's wrasse
Taxa named by Gerald R. Allen
Taxa named by John Ernest Randall
Fish described in 2003